Memory for Max, Claire, Ida and Company is a Canadian documentary film, directed by Allan King and released in 2005. The film profiles a group of residents at Baycrest Health Sciences, a long term care facility in Toronto, who are suffering from varying stages of dementia.

The film premiered at the 2005 Toronto International Film Festival, and was broadcast on television by TVOntario as an episode of the documentary series The View from Here in February 2006. Its first DVD release featured a commentary track recorded by social workers and psychologists, to facilitate the film's use as a teaching tool for health care providers.

The film was named to TIFF's annual year-end Canada's Top Ten list for 2005, and was shortlisted for the Donald Brittain Award for best television documentary on a social or political topic at the 21st Gemini Awards in 2006.

References

External links
 

2005 films
2005 documentary films
Canadian documentary films
Films directed by Allan King
Documentary films about dementia
2000s English-language films
2000s Canadian films